Anthocomus rufus is a species of beetles belonging to the family Melyridae.

It is native to Europe.

References

Melyridae